Ecava is a Malaysian company specializing in HMI / SCADA software. Founded in 2005, Ecava is a Private limited company headquartered in Selangor, Malaysia.

Products and Services
Ecava develops and distributes IntegraXor SCADA and Kioskit software.
Ecava also provides engineering development and services for the industrial automation and control system industry.

References

External links 
 Ecava Company website
 Ecava IntegraXor SCADA Product website

2005 establishments in Malaysia
Technology companies of Malaysia
Technology companies established in 2005